The Southwestern Journal of Theology is an academic journal published by Southwestern Baptist Theological Seminary. It was founded in 1958, and is published biannually. The current editor is David S. Dockery.

External links

Academic journals published by universities and colleges
Protestant studies journals
Publications established in 1958
Biannual journals
1958 establishments in Texas